Tatou may refer to:
Colette Tatou, a fictional character from the 2007 Disney/Pixar animated film Ratatouille
Tatou Tapatoru's ezine, Bi monthly ezine from Tapatoru for Maori trans who live or have lived in Wellington New Zealand
Tatou or Giant Armadillo, the largest species of armadillo
Tatou, French for Armadillo
Tatou (town) (塔头镇), town in Jiexi County, Guangdong, China
"Tatou Strip Tease", a Dusty Fingers track from their Dusty Fingers Volume 15 album

See also
Audrey Tautou (born 1978), French film actress
Tautou, a song by Brand New